Friedrich Ritter von Wiesner (27 October 1871 – 5 November 1951) was an Austrian lawyer and diplomat.

Youth and education 
Wiesner was the son of Agnes and Julius Wiesner, and was born in Mariabrunn in Vienna. After attending grammar school in Vienna and Kremsmünster, he served as a one-year volunteer. He learned French, English, Italian, and Czech and studied law and political science at the University of Vienna. In 1896 he received his doctorate and became a judge in Baden bei Wien and Vienna.

After his father, a respected botanist, was knighted in 1909, Friedrich's name was changed to Friedrich Ritter von Wiesner from then until 1919.

Civil service career 
In 1911, Friedrich Ritter von Wiesner joined the Austro-Hungarian Ministry of Foreign Affairs as Secretary of State. At the end of 1912 he became a lieutenant colonel in the Imperial-Royal Landwehr. In 1913 he became a section councilor in the Foreign Ministry.

During the July Crisis in 1914, Wiesner headed the special commission to investigate the murder of the heir to the throne,  Franz Ferdinand.

Time of National Socialism and old age 

After Austria was annexed to Hitler's Germany, Wiesner was arrested by the Gestapo in 1938, like many other legitimists, and taken to the Buchenwald concentration camp . His wife appealed to the Attorney General Welsch for his release. On January 21, 1939 Wiesner was released from "protective custody", but had to settle in Würzburg by order of the police. At the end of 1939 Wiesner was allowed to return to Vienna.

References 

1951 deaths
1871 births
20th-century Austrian judges
Buchenwald concentration camp survivors
University of Vienna alumni
Recipients of the Iron Cross, 1st class
Grand Crosses of the Order of Franz Joseph
Austro-Hungarian diplomats